

1930s

LGBT
1930s in LGBT history
1930s
1930s
LGBT